Jacco Folkert Eltingh (born 29 August 1970) is a former professional male tennis player and former world No. 1 doubles player from the Netherlands.

He is best known for his success in doubles with fellow countryman Paul Haarhuis. Together they won all four Grand Slam doubles titles at least once. Eltingh is the youngest player in the Open Era to achieve the career Grand Slam in men's doubles.

Eltingh reached his career-high singles ranking in February 1995, when he climbed to world No. 19, notably reaching the quarterfinals of both the Australian Open and Wimbledon in 1995. In his professional career he has won four singles and 44 doubles titles.

In November 2005, Eltingh was elected to the ATP Board as the player representative for Europe.

Major finals

Grand Slam finals

Doubles: 8 (6–2)

Mixed Doubles: 1 (0–1)

Olympic finals

Doubles: 1 (0–1)

ATP Career Finals

Singles: 4 (4 titles)

Doubles: 60 (44 titles, 16 runner-ups)

ATP Challenger and ITF Futures finals

Singles: 2 (0–2)

Doubles: 6 (3–3)

Performance timelines

Singles

Doubles

References

External links
 
 
 
 
 
 

1970 births
Living people
Australian Open (tennis) champions
Dutch male tennis players
French Open champions
Olympic tennis players of the Netherlands
People from Heerde
Tennis players at the 1996 Summer Olympics
US Open (tennis) champions
Wimbledon champions
Grand Slam (tennis) champions in men's doubles
Tennis commentators
ATP number 1 ranked doubles tennis players
ITF World Champions
Sportspeople from Gelderland